Humble Pie are an English rock band formed by guitarist and singer Steve Marriott in Moreton, Essex, in 1969. They are known as one of the first supergroups of the late 1960s and found success in the early 1970s with songs such as "Black Coffee", "30 Days in the Hole", "I Don't Need No Doctor", "Hot 'n' Nasty" and "Natural Born Bugie". The original line-up featured lead vocalist and guitarist Steve Marriott from Small Faces, vocalist and guitarist Peter Frampton from the Herd, former Spooky Tooth bassist Greg Ridley and a 17-year-old drummer, Jerry Shirley, from the Apostolic Intervention.

1968: Background and formation 

Marriott befriended Frampton during the latter months of 1968, and the pair bonded over their unwanted 'teen heart-throb' status in the UK and their shared desire to be taken more seriously as musicians. Frampton was at something of a loose end professionally, having recently left the Herd. Marriott, acting as mentor to his younger new friend, agreed to help Frampton find a new musical direction.

Marriott had initially wanted Frampton to join the Small Faces as a second guitarist in order to expand their musical horizons, rather than form an entirely new group with him, but this proposal met with resistance from his Small Faces bandmates Ronnie Lane and Ian McLagan. Frampton guested during a few of the band's live shows in October which, although well received by audiences, seemingly did nothing to convince Marriott's reluctant bandmates to allow Frampton to join them on a permanent basis. Consequently, Marriott was soon helping Frampton to form his own band as a backup plan.

In December 1968 at the behest of their long-time recording engineer/producer Glyn Johns, the Small Faces served as a backing band for French singer Johnny Hallyday during recording sessions in Paris for his latest album, "Rivière... Ouvre Ton lit" (aka "Je Suis Né Dans La Rue"), and Marriott invited Frampton along to participate. The week-long sessions may have been another of Marriott's attempts to test the waters to expand the Small Faces lineup, but tensions were reportedly brought to a head and the seeds sown for the group's break-up in the new year. The Hallyday sessions therefore proved to be the Small Faces' final studio recordings. Embryonic versions of "Bang!" and "What You Will" from Humble Pie's debut album were recorded by the Small Faces and Frampton during the sessions, and the five musicians can be heard playing together (and also in various combinations with Hallyday's regular band) throughout the album, with Frampton's distinctive guitar work especially prominent. Their performances together offer a tantalising glimpse of how an expanded Small Faces lineup might have sounded.

It was not to be, however. For reasons that remain ill-defined to this day, Lane and McLagan were now more opposed than ever to Frampton joining the group. As a result, Marriott's efforts to put a band together from scratch for Frampton became more concerted, and Greg Ridley and Jerry Shirley were successfully auditioned. An increasingly-frustrated Marriott consequently stormed offstage during a Small Faces live performance with Alexis Korner at the Alexandra Palace on New Year's Eve, and backstage he duly announced to his bandmates that he was leaving. He then approached Frampton with a view to joining him in the band he had helped to form for him.

1969–1970: Official formation and UK chart success 

After fulfilling outstanding live performance commitments, including a European tour in January, the Small Faces' dissolution was formally announced in March 1969, and Marriott and Frampton's plans to form a new group together were unveiled (although the band were already formed and had been rehearsing together since January).

Having been instantly labelled by the UK music press as a supergroup, the band chose the name Humble Pie in order to downplay such expectations and signed with Andrew Loog Oldham's record label Immediate Records. Their debut album, As Safe as Yesterday Is, was released in August 1969, along with the single, "Natural Born Bugie"/"Wrist Job", which reached No. 4 hit in the UK Singles Chart; the album peaked at No. 16 in the UK album charts. As Safe as Yesterday Is was one of the first albums to be described by the term "heavy metal" in a 1970 review in Rolling Stone magazine.

Their second album, Town and Country, was rush-released in the UK in November 1969 while Immediate Records were on the verge of financial collapse and the band was away on its first tour of the US.  This album featured a more acoustic sound and songs written by all four members. Humble Pie concerts at this time featured an acoustic set, with a radical re-working of Graham Gouldman's "For Your Love" as its centrepiece, followed by an electric set. Recent tape archives show that the band recorded around 30 songs in its first nine months of existence, many of which remained unreleased for decades, including an interpretation of Henry Glover's "Drown in My Own Tears".

1970–1971: Focus on American success 

During 1970, with the Immediate label having finally collapsed, Humble Pie signed to A&M Records and Dee Anthony became their manager. Anthony was focused on the US market and suggested the band discard the acoustic set and instigate a more raucous sound with Marriott as the front man. The group's first album for A&M, Humble Pie, was released later that year and alternated between progressive rock and hard rock. A single, "Big Black Dog", was released to coincide with the album and failed to chart, however the band was becoming known for popular live rock shows in the US.

It was during this period that Peter Frampton acquired his famed "Phenix" guitar, the black 1954 Les Paul Custom that became his signature instrument and his favourite guitar for the next decade. Humble Pie was playing a run of shows at the Fillmore West in San Francisco in early December 1970 and during the first show Frampton was plagued by sound problems with his then-current guitar, a semi-acoustic Gibson 335, which was prone to unwanted feedback at higher volumes. After the show he was approached by fan and musician Mark Mariana, who loaned him the modified 1954 Gibson Les Paul, and by the end of the second show Frampton had become so enamoured of the guitar that he offered to buy it on the spot, but Mariana refused payment. Frampton played it almost exclusively for the next ten years. It was featured on the cover of Frampton Comes Alive and was thought to have been destroyed in 1980 when a plane carrying Frampton's stage equipment crashed in Venezuela during a South American tour, killing the crew, but with the guitar in fact surviving the accident with some minor damage. It was eventually returned to Frampton in 2011.

On 9 July 1971 Humble Pie opened for Grand Funk Railroad at their historic Shea Stadium concert, an event that broke the Beatles record for fastest selling stadium concert, to that date. Also in 1971, Humble Pie released their most successful record to date, Rock On, as well as a live album recorded at the Fillmore East in New York entitled Performance Rockin' the Fillmore. The live album reached No. 21 on the US Billboard 200 and was certified gold by the RIAA. "I Don't Need No Doctor" became an FM radio standard in the US, peaking at No. 73 on the Billboard Hot 100 and propelling the album up the charts. By the time of the album's release, Frampton had left the band and went on to enjoy success as a solo artist.

1972–1975: Clem Clempson, The Blackberries and further success 

Frampton was replaced by Clem Clempson and Humble Pie moved toward a harder sound emphasising Marriott's blues and soul roots. Their first record with Clempson, Smokin', was released in March 1972, along with two singles "Hot 'n' Nasty"  and "30 Days in the Hole" (the latter of which became one of their best-known efforts).  It was the band's most commercially successful record and reached No. 6 on the US charts, helped by a busy touring schedule. After the success of Smokin, the band's record label A&M released Humble Pie's first two Immediate albums as one double album titled Lost and Found. The marketing ploy was a success and the album charted at No. 37 on the Billboard 200.

Looking for a more authentic R&B sound, Marriott hired three female backing vocalists, The Blackberries.  The trio consisted of Venetta Fields, Clydie King and Sherlie Matthews, who was later replaced by Billie Barnum. They had performed with Ike and Tina Turner as The Ikettes and with Ray Charles as The Raelettes. This new line-up included Sidney George on saxophone for the recording of Eat It, a double album released in April 1973 made up of Marriott originals (some acoustic), R&B numbers, and a Humble Pie concert recorded in Glasgow. The album peaked at No. 13 in the US charts. Album number seven, Thunderbox, was released in February 1974 and Street Rats a year later.

Street Rats (February 1975) was created at the same time as Marriott was producing a solo album and a collaboration album with Greg Ridley. After the release of this album and their 1975 "Goodbye Pie Tour", Humble Pie disbanded, citing musical differences. Marriott went on to produce his first solo album Marriott and promptly moved back to the UK.

 1979–1981: Steve Marriott's Humble Pie without Frampton and Ridley 
In late 1979, Marriott and Shirley, now managed by Leber-Krebs, revived Humble Pie, adding Bobby Tench, former vocalist and guitarist from The Jeff Beck Group, along with bassist Anthony "Sooty" Jones from New York. They submitted  "Fool for a Pretty Face", a song Marriott and Shirley had just written, to record labels. They secured a recording contract with Atlantic Records subsidiary Atco and in the UK their material was released by Jet Records, owned by former Small Faces manager Don Arden. They recorded the album On to Victory (April 1980) and "Fool for a Pretty Face" reached No. 52 on the US Billboard Hot 100. On to Victory peaked at No. 60 on the Billboard 200.

Humble Pie toured the US in 1980 as part of the 'Rock 'N' Roll Marathon Bill' with Frank Marino & Mahogany Rush, Angel & Mother's Finest. Humble Pie toured with Ted Nugent & Aerosmith in 1981 and also recorded the album Go for the Throat (June 1981). This album was originally recorded by the band as a raw-edged Rhythm and Blues album, but their record company wanted a slicker album.

In April 1981, at the beginning of the promotional tour for the Go for the Throat album, Marriott crushed his hand in a hotel room door, delaying earlier scheduled appearances by the band, and he later developed a duodenal ulcer forcing the cancellation of all further tour dates in late July 1981. Soon afterwards this line-up disbanded due to the loss of the Atlantic contract and the ceasing of financial support from Leber-Krebs. And to make matters even worse, the band's equipment truck was stolen as well.

 1982: Steve Marriott forms a new band billed as Humble Pie 
In 1982 Marriott was back on the road with Jim Leverton (bass, backing vocals), former Steppenwolf keyboardist Goldy McJohn and Chicago-born drummer Fallon Williams III. This grouping was originally set to be called The Official Receivers, The Three Trojans (after McJohn departed) or The Pie, but ended up billed by promoters as Humble Pie. McJohn was let go after suffering drug troubles and the remaining trio toured Australia in October 1982 billed as Small Faces to entice patrons. In January 1983 Leverton ran into trouble at U.S. Immigration and was deported back to England.

Marriott based himself in the Atlanta, Georgia area, where his second wife Pamela Stephens was from, and continued to tour clubs as Humble Pie. Atlanta musician Keith Christopher (from The Brains) took over bass and a young guitarist from Tennessee, Tommy Johnson, joined as well. After a deal with Capricorn Records fell through due to the label ceasing to trade, this line-up went into Pyramid Eye Studios in Chattanooga, Tennessee to record three songs intended for an album which didn't materialize.

Following Johnson leaving and being replaced by Phil Dix, they were scheduled to record demos with Yes and ELP producer Eddy Offord at Eddy's studio in Atlanta with Rick Richards of Georgia Satellites as the new guitarist. But before recording sessions began, Rick and Keith were fired from the band by Marriott for showing up late to one of the sessions. The recordings were finished with Fallon on drums and Dave Hewitt (from Babe Ruth) on bass, but failed to attract a record label.

On 4 September 1983 Humble Pie performed at the Electric Cowboy Festival in Columbia, Tennessee where Marriott was carried onstage by a roadie due to a very large cast on his leg. They appeared as a last-minute replacement for the English group Madness. After this there were some more US club dates, which were Marriott's last official live performances under the name Humble Pie. He then disbanded the group and returned to England in late 1983.

 1988–2000: Jerry Shirley's Humble Pie, new Marriott and Frampton songs 
Jerry Shirley obtained the rights to the name Humble Pie in 1988 and reformed the group with different musicians. This project was called New Humble Pie or Humble Pie featuring Jerry Shirley, where Shirley was the only original member. The band began performing concerts and was based in Cleveland, Ohio, where Shirley was working as an on-air radio personality at Cleveland's WNCX. The line-up included vocalist Charlie Huhn, who also played lead and rhythm guitar. While Huhn and Shirley were the only permanent members of the group, several other musicians appeared, including Wally Stocker and a returning Anthony "Sooty" Jones on bass. Jones was quickly replaced by Sean Beavan (who was engineering their 1989 independent single release "Still Rockin'").

In August 1989 they appeared in the line-up at the Woodstock Festival's 20th Anniversary Celebration. By 1990, Scott Allen had replaced Beavan on bass and a little later that year, Cleveland guitarist Alan Greene had joined in place of Stocker. Bassist Sam Nemon played with this lineup from 1992 to 1996, when Brad Johnson took over. In August 1999 Shirley was seriously injured in an auto accident and later returned to England.

Frampton and Marriott started collaborating again in 1990. Two songs from this collaboration, "The Bigger They Come" and "I Won't Let You Down", with Steve Marriott's vocals, appeared on Frampton's album Shine On: A Collection. Marriott died in a house fire on 20 April 1991.

 2000–2003: Former members reform, Back on Track album and Steve Marriott Memorial concert 
In 2000 Charlie Huhn continued on as Humble Pie without Shirley to fulfill live dates. Rick Craig of Halloween joined the line up with bassist Kent "Bubba" Gascoyne and Jamie Darnell on drums. Michigan guitarist Patrick Thomas took Craig's place later that year and Ian Evans (from The Outlaws) replaced Gascoyne. After completing touring duties they disbanded and Huhn went on to join Foghat.

Having returned to the U.K, Shirley re-formed Humble Pie in 2001 with a line-up including the original bassist Greg Ridley, former Humble Pie member vocalist and guitarist Bobby Tench and new rhythm guitarist Dave Colwell (of Bad Company). They recorded Humble Pie's thirteenth studio album, Back on Track (2002), which comprised new songs and was released by Sanctuary Records. Keyboard players Zoot Money and Victor Martin were brought in for recording sessions. A brief tour of UK and Germany with Company of Snakes followed with new keyboardist Dean Rees and guitarist Johnny Warman. But Ridley fell ill late in 2002 and the band split up.

Shirley appeared at the Steve Marriott Tribute Concert held at the London Astoria in 2001, to commemorate the 10th anniversary of Marriott's death. The concert featured a grouping of early Humble Pie members Frampton, Clempson, Ridley and Shirley. Former member guitarist Bobby Tench also appeared as the frontman for the house band, which included Zak Starkey, keyboard player Rabbit Bundrick and bassist Rick Wills. This concert was released as a DVD by Chrome Dreams in 2005 entitled The Steve Marriott Astoria Memorial Concert 2001, and as an album with the title One More for the Ol' Tosser (2006).

In May 2003 Ridley had recovered enough to undertake two gigs, one at a club in Bucharest, Romania, with a group he called Greg Ridley's Humble Pie that included Ridley, Rees, Chris George (guitar), Stefan John (guitar) and Karl Randall (drums). He died later that year, on 19 November 2003, in Alicante, Spain of pneumonia and resulting complications. He was 62.

 2018 tours 
During 2018 Jerry Shirley still owned the Humble Pie name and instigated a new lineup which he would direct but not tour with. Shirley stated: "We all have a great sense of love and pride for Humble Pie, the [former] members their families and what we were able to achieve and it goes without saying that no one will ever replace Steve, Peter or any member of the band. My goal is keep the legacy of Humble Pie intact as one of the greatest live acts in rock, while satiating the need for generations of our beloved fans to again enjoy our music performed live by world class musicians".

Shirley chose Dave "Bucket" Colwell, who had played and recorded with the band on the 2002 album Back on Track to lead the band live on tour as co-front man and lead guitarist, alongside former Savoy Brown and Cactus singer Jimmy Kunes. The new line up included second guitarist James "Roto" Rotondi, bassist David C. Gross (replaced in 2019 by Ivan Bodley) and drummer Bobby Marks. They began a fifteen-show tour of the U.S on 31 August 2018 in Riverhead, New York. The band performed songs from the Humble Pie catalogue and also songs by others such as, Bad Company's "Can't Get Enough (of your Love)" and Free's "All Right Now".

 Personnel Original members Steve Marriott – guitar, vocals, keyboards, harmonica (1969–1975, 1979–1983; died 1991)
 Jerry Shirley – drums, keyboards (1969–1975, 1979–1981, 1988–1999, 2001–2002, 2018–present)
 Greg Ridley – bass, vocals, guitar (1969–1975, 2001–2002; died 2003)
 Peter Frampton – guitar, vocals, keyboards (1969–1971)Current members Jerry Shirley – drums, percussion (1969–1975, 1979–1981, 1988–1999, 2001–2002, 2018–present)
 Clem Clempson – guitar, vocals (1971–1975, 2019–present)
 Zoot Money – keyboards, vocals 
 Johnny Warman – guitar, vocals 
 Nigel Harrison – bass 
 Dave Walker – vocals 

 Discography 

 Studio albums Live albums:'''

 Compilations Lost and Found (1973) (US Cash – 41)Back Home Again (1976)Greatest Hits (1977)Best of Humble Pie (1982)Classics Volume 14 (1987)A Piece of the Pie (1993)Early Years (1994)Hot n' Nasty: The Anthology (1994)The Scrubbers Sessions (1997)The Immediate Years: Natural Born Boogie (1999)Running with the Pack (1999)Twentieth Century Masters: The Millennium Collection (2000)The Atlanta Years (2005)The Definitive Collection (2006)The A&M Vinyl Box Set (2017)The A&M CD box Set (2022)I Need a Star in My Life(2022)

 Singles 

 Videos and DVDs The Steve Marriott Astoria Memorial Concert 2001 (2005) Chrome Dreams

 References 

Sources:
Hewitt, Paulo and Hellier, John. Steve Marriott – All Too Beautiful... Helter Skelter (2005). Best Seat in the House: Drumming in the '70s with Marriott, Frampton and Humble Pie'' by Jerry Shirley (Paperback – 1 June 2011)

External links 

 

Humble Pie (band)
1969 establishments in England
1975 disestablishments in England
1979 establishments in England
1983 disestablishments in England
1988 establishments in England
2000 disestablishments in England
2001 establishments in England
2002 disestablishments in England
2018 establishments in England
Musical quartets
British supergroups
Rock music supergroups
Musical groups from Essex
English blues rock musical groups
English hard rock musical groups
Musical groups established in 1969
Musical groups disestablished in 1975
Musical groups reestablished in 1979
Musical groups disestablished in 1983
Musical groups reestablished in 1988
Musical groups disestablished in 2000
Musical groups reestablished in 2001
Musical groups disestablished in 2002
Musical groups reestablished in 2018
Immediate Records artists
A&M Records artists
Atco Records artists
Peter Frampton